Maholi is a town and a nagar panchayat in Sitapur district in the Indian state of Uttar Pradesh. It is now one of the 7 Tehsils in District Sitapur being carved out in 2013 from Misrikh.

Geography
It has an average elevation of 144 metres (472 feet). The town is located on the left bank of River Kathna. It is about 24 km from its District city Sitapur, 110 km from Lucknow (the capital of Uttar Pradesh) and 390 km from Delhi (the capital of India). It is well connected by road and railway. It is situated on the National Highway Number 24 (G. T. Road) connecting Lucknow to Delhi. The highway is now a four-lane highway.

Demographics
 India census, Maholi had a population of 21,331. Males constitute 52.4% of the population and females 47.6%. Maholi has an average literacy rate of 69%, lower than the national average of 74.04%: male literacy is 74%, and female literacy is 63.5%. In Maholi, 13% of the population is under 6 years of age.

Places
The town has few visiting places. Baba Baijnath Temple, Santoshi Mata and Baba Tekeshwarnath Temple are situated at the west end of maholi at the bank of river Kathna. Locally famous Baba Karedev Temple is about 3.0 km away from Maholi towards Delhi at river Kathna bank which is also used as picnic place by regional people. The natural river front of River Kathna near Baba Baijnath Temple is also very beautiful and scenic. In Rainy season it becomes very beautiful and you can even see peacocks dancing around. 
In addition to that, city market in maholi is also a place to visit. You can get everything in this market. This market is a main buying place for all the villages around Maholi as well as 18 thousand people of Maholi.

There are four intermediate colleges and two degree college in the town. Sarswati Vidya Mandir Inter College, Uma Shankar Inter College, Krishak Inter College and Radhakrishana-Satyaprabha Siksha Sansthan are Intermediate College and Kedarnath patel Mahavidyalay Lalpur Sikatiha Maholi Sitapur provides B.A. from all subject and B.Sc., Dayashankar Mahavidyalaya degree college who is provides  provides B.Sc. and B.A. degrees.

Hospitals

The town has a government hospital. Recently, it has been upgraded to a Community Health Centre.

In addition to that this town has many Private Doctors clinic and Nursing Homes also available.

External links
Uttar Pradesh Assembly Elections
Maholi Assembly Elections

References

Cities and towns in Sitapur district